Pasikhat Dzhukalaeva (Cyrillic: Пасихат Джукалаева, 1881? - 2005) was an alleged super-centenarian from Chechnya.

Biography 

Dzhukalaeva was born in the village of Tazbichi in the Itum-Kale region in 1881 and grew up there. At 19 years old she married her husband, Vaid, who was also from Itum-Kale. They had two sons and four daughters. Dzhukalaeva heard about the 1917 Revolution months later when her husband went to sell wood in Grozny.

In February 1944, Dzukalaeva, along with all other Chechens, was deported to Kazakhstan; on the journey her daughter Pesy died, but they were unable to bury her. They settled in Emba, Dzhurun district of Aktobe. Dzhukalaeva returned to Chechnya years later and settled in Grozny.

During her life she witnessed huge changes to Chechnya and remembered the Russian Revolution, the Second World War, resettlement to Kazakhstan and both Chechen wars. She considered Russia to be a different country and wanted peace for Chechnya. Towards the end of her life she lived with her grand-daughter, but had an extended family of nine grandchildren, eighteen great-grandchildren and seven great-great-grandchildren. Her elder sister Asho was also reportedly a super-centenarian. She died in Grozny in 2005.

Legacy 
Prior to her death Dzhukalaeva was recognized in Russia as the oldest woman in Chechnya. Her achievement was listed in the Divo Book of Records of Russia.

In 2010, artist Zareta Murtazalieva painted a portrait of Dzhukalaeva as part of an exhibition celebrating Chechen women at the National Museum of the Chechen Republic.

References 

Chechen people
2005 deaths
Longevity claims
People from the Russian Empire